The 2015–16 Incarnate Word Cardinals women's basketball team represented the University of the Incarnate Word during the 2015–16 NCAA Division I women's basketball season. The Cardinals, led by second year head coach Kate Henderson, played their home games at McDermott Center. They were members of the Southland Conference. They finished the season 6–23, 3–15 in Southland play to finish in a tie for 12th place.

The 2015–16 season was year 3 of a 4-year transitional period for Incarnate Word from D2 to D1. In years 2–4 Incarnate Word is classified as a D1 school for scheduling purposes. They played a full conference schedule, and they could win the regular season conference title. However Incarnate Word could not participate in the conference tourney until the 2017–18 season, at which time they will also be able to enter the NCAA tournament, should they win the conference. Incarnate Word was eligible to participate in the WBI or WNIT had they been invited.

On March 7, Kate Henderson has resigned her position. She finished at Incarnate Word with a 2-year record of 19–66.

Audio Streaming
All Incarnate Word games were to be broadcast on KUIW Radio, and they provided streaming of all non-televised home games shown via UIW TV.

Roster

Schedule

|-
!colspan=12 style="background:#FF0000; color:#000000;"| Non-conference regular season

|-
!colspan=12 style="background:#FF0000; color:#000000;"| Southland Conference regular season

See also
2015–16 Incarnate Word Cardinals men's basketball team

References

Incarnate Word Cardinals women's basketball seasons
Incarnate Word
Incarnate Word Cardinals basketball
Incarnate Word Cardinals basketball